Louis-Éphrem Olivier (August 28, 1848 – December 21, 1882) was a physician and political figure in Quebec, Canada. He represented Mégantic in the House of Commons of Canada from 1878 to 1882 as a Liberal member.

He was born in Saint-Nicolas, Canada East, the son of Jean Baptiste Olivier and Thessile Plante, and was educated at the Séminaire de Québec. In 1875, he married Maria Adelia Pelletier. Olivier was unsuccessful when he ran for reelection in 1882. He died later that year at the age of 34.

References 
 
The Canadian parliamentary companion and annual register, 1881, CH Mackintosh

1848 births
1882 deaths
Members of the House of Commons of Canada from Quebec
Liberal Party of Canada MPs